Paulino Fernandes Madeca (born 28 November 1927, Chingolo, Cabinda, Angola; died 9 January 2008, Luanda, Angola) was a Catholic Bishop of Cabinda.

Life 
Madeca entered a seminary in 1940. He subsequently studied theology and philosophy in Luanda and was ordained to the priesthood on 20 July 1958.

On 22 July 1983 Pope John Paul II appointed him titular bishop of Egnatia and auxiliary bishop in the Roman Catholic Archdiocese of Luanda. He was consecrated by Archbishop Fortunato Baldelli, on 9 October of the same year; coconsecrating were Eduardo André Muaca, Archbishop of Luanda, and Oscar Lino Lopes Fernandes Braga, Bishop of Benguela. On 2 July 1984 he was transferred to the Diocese of Cabinda.

Madeca resigned on 11 February 2005. He died on 9 January 2008, at the Military Hospital of Luanda; he is buried in Cabinda.

References 
 
 „Angola: Morreu o primeiro bispo de Cabinda“ (Portuguese)

1927 births
2008 deaths
20th-century Roman Catholic bishops in Angola
21st-century Roman Catholic bishops in Angola
Roman Catholic bishops of Cabinda